Profane Existence is a Minneapolis-based anarcho-punk collective. Established in 1989, the collective publishes a nationally known zine (also called Profane Existence), as well as releasing and distributing anarcho-punk, crust, and grindcore music, and printing and publishing pamphlets and literature. Stacy Thompson describes the collective as "the largest, longest-lasting, and most influential collective in Anarcho-Punk so far."  The collective folded in 1998, although its distribution arm, then called Blackened Distribution, continued operating.  It restarted in 2000.  "Making punk a threat again" is the group's slogan.

History

Launched in 1989, the Profane Existence magazine has been described as "the largest of the anarchist Punk fanzines in North America."  The magazine deals with a very broad range of topics, including veganism, animal, women's and minority rights, anti-fascist action and the punk lifestyle. It published feature articles, interviews, reports on local scenes around the world, editorials, letters, "how-to" articles, and so on.  Thompson writes that the zine "functions as [a newspaper] for many Anarcho-Punks, especially those in the Twin Cities area."  Until it ceased publication in 1998 Profane Existence was free in the Twin Cities and cost $1–3 elsewhere; then as now customers who order the zine through the mail are only charged for shipping.  The zine was initially published in a black and white tabloid format.  It switched to an 8½ x 11" magazine format with issue #23 (Autumn 1994) but returned to a tabloid format (now with color front and back covers) with issue #38 (Spring 2000).

In 1992 the group co-published (with Maximum Rock n Roll) the first edition of Book Your Own Fuckin' Life, a directory (organized by region) of bands, distributors, venues, houses where "touring bands or traveling punks could sleep and sometimes eat for free," etc.--what Thompson describes as a "Yellow Pages of sorts" for "touring punk bands and punks in general."

Profane Existence Records, the collective's record label, was also founded in 1989.  One of the label's first releases was "Extinction," the seminal New York City crust punk band Nausea's only full-length album, which John Griffin describes as "as important to the punks of the '90s as The Sex Pistols' Never Mind the Bollocks was to the punks of the late '70s."  Another notable early release was Asbestosdeath's second 7", "Dejection"; Asbestosdeath's members went on to form the metal bands Sleep, High on Fire, and Om.  Throughout the early and mid-1990s, Profane Existence released or distributed records by many other crust bands, including  Doom, Misery, Fleas and Lice, Anarcrust, Counterblast, Dirt, and Hellbastard.  Thompson writes that the label "became ground zero for [the crust] movement" and that the aesthetic of second-wave (i.e., beginning in the late 1980s) anarcho-punk "is currently exemplified by the bands released" on the label.  More recently, the label has released music by bands like Behind Enemy Lines, MURDER DISCO X, Iskra, and The Cooters. In 2009 they hosted independent crust radio shows, Scairt Radio, Doomed Society, Organize and Arise and others. This finished in 2012, where the magazine became an online magazine.

Profane Existence featured artists

Profane Existence has regularly featured some of the most prominent punk visual artists in underground punk culture. The featured artists are known for illustrating punk album covers, magazines, showing their work in galleries or for their work as activists.

58- "Hush" a.k.a. Jeremy Clark, best known for illustrating Slug and Lettuce.
56  - Amy Toxic (illustrated for Alternative Tentacles, Toxic Narcotic,  Caustic Christ,  The Boston Phoenix,) Married to a member of Toxic Narcotic.
55 – Matt Garabedian – (drummer and illustrator for Aus-Rotten and Behind Enemy Lines.)
54- "Fly", a New York City artist and activist. (Book "Peops", illustrating Slug and Lettuce, mural at ABC No Rio.)
48- "Steve" (From Visions of War, illustrated Profane Existence merchandise)
47-  Kieran Plunkett- (illustrated for UK Subs, The Restarts)
46 – "Mid" aka Rob Middleton (illustrated for Napalm Death and Extreme Noise Terror)
45- "Marald" (illustrated for Wartorn, Warcollapse, Imperial Leather, Borndead, State of Fear, The Cooters)

See also
Profane Existence discography
Minneapolis hardcore

Footnotes

References
Thompson, Stacy (2004).  Punk Productions: Unfinished Business.  SUNY Press. .

External links

1989 establishments in Minnesota
2013 disestablishments in Minnesota
American independent record labels
Anarchist organizations in the United States
Anarchist periodicals published in the United States
Defunct magazines published in the United States
Independent record labels based in Minnesota
Magazines established in 1989
Magazines disestablished in 2013
Magazines published in Minnesota
Music magazines published in the United States
Punk record labels
Punk zines
Mass media in Minneapolis–Saint Paul